This is a list of flag bearers who have represented Namibia at the Olympics.

Flag bearers carry the national flag of their country at the opening ceremony of the Olympic Games.

See also
Namibia at the Olympics

References

Namibia at the Olympics
Namibia
Olympic flagbearers